Claudio Fasolo (born 9 January 1960) is an Italian former professional racing cyclist. He rode in the 1985 Tour de France.

References

External links
 

1960 births
Living people
Italian male cyclists
Cyclists from Turin